The 1959 German football championship was the culmination of the football season in the Federal Republic of Germany in 1958–59. Eintracht Frankfurt were crowned champions for the first time after a group stage and a final.

It was Eintracht's second appearance in the German final, having previously lost to FC Bayern Munich in 1932. The team won all seven games it played in the finals. On the strength of this title, the club participated in the 1959–60 European Cup, where it became the first German club to reach the final.

For the losing finalist, Kickers Offenbach, it was its second time to reach the national title game, having lost to VfB Stuttgart in 1950. It was also the only time the final was contested by two clubs from the state of Hesse.

The format used to determine the German champion was very similar to the one used in the 1957 and 1958 season. Nine clubs qualified for the tournament, with the runners-up of North and Southwest having to play a qualifying match. The remaining eight clubs then played a home-and-away round in two groups of four, with the two group winners entering the final. In previous seasons, only a single round had been played in the group stage, increasing the number of group games per team from three to six from 1959.

Qualified teams
The teams qualified for the finals through the 1958–59 Oberliga season:

Competition

Qualifying round

Group 1

Group 2

Final

References

Sources
 kicker Allmanach 1990, by kicker, page 165 & 177 - German championship 1959

External links
 German Championship 1958-59 at Weltfussball.de
 Germany - Championship 1958-59 at RSSSF.com
 German championship 1959 at Fussballdaten.de

1959
1